Simon-Xavier Cimon (December 4, 1829 – June 26, 1887) was a businessman and political figure in Quebec, Canada. He represented Charlevoix in the House of Commons of Canada as a Conservative member from 1867 to 1872 and from 1881 to 1887.

He was born in La Malbaie, Lower Canada in 1829 and studied at the Petit Séminaire de Québec. He became a building contractor and built the parliament buildings at Quebec City in 1878. Cimon established a pulp and paper mill at La Malbaie during the 1880s. With Edmund James Flynn, he owned the Journal de Québec. In 1884, he helped establish a weekly newspaper L'Écho des Laurentides at La Malbaie. He died at La Malbaie of apoplexy in 1887 while still in office.

His son Simon succeeded him in the House of Commons as representative for Charlevoix.

His brother Cléophe had represented Charlevoix in the legislative assembly for the Province of Canada.

External links
 
 
 The Canadian parliamentary companion, HJ Morgan (1871)
 La presse régionale. Plus d'un siècle d'histoire dans Charlevoix

1829 births
1887 deaths
Conservative Party of Canada (1867–1942) MPs
Members of the House of Commons of Canada from Quebec